
Gmina Jeżowe is a rural gmina (administrative district) in Nisko County, Subcarpathian Voivodeship, in south-eastern Poland.

Villages
Gmina Jeżowe contains the villages and settlements of Cholewiana Góra, Groble, Jata, Jeżowe, Krzywdy, Nowy Nart, Pogorzałka, Sibigi, Sójkowa, Stary Nart and Zalesie.

Neighbouring gminas
Gmina Jeżowe is bordered by the gminas of Bojanów, Dzikowiec, Kamień, Nisko, Nowa Sarzyna, Raniżów and Rudnik nad 
Sanem.

International Relations

Twin Towns And Sister Cities/Regions

 Drohobych Raion In Ukraine
 Atzenbrugg Community In Austria

References

Polish official population figures 2006

Jezowe
Nisko County